Institute of Solid State Chemistry and Mechanochemistry of the Siberian Branch of the RAS is a research institute in Novosibirsk, Russia. It was founded in 1944.

History
Institute of Solid State Chemistry and Mechanochemistry is one of the oldest scientific institutes in Siberia. It was founded in 1944 as the Chemical and Metallurgical Institute. Five years later, thanks to the institute, a ceramic pipe plant was launched in Dorogino.

Later, the institute became part of the Siberian Branch of the USSR Academy of Sciences.

In 1964, the scientific organization was renamed the Institute of Physicochemical Principles of Mineral Raw Materials Processing, and in 1980, it was renamed the Institute of Solid State Chemistry and Mineral Raw Materials Processing.

In 1997, the institute was renamed the Institute of Solid State Chemistry and Mechanochemistry.

Activities
The main directions of scientific research are mechanochemistry of organic and inorganic substances, mineral and renewable raw materials, reactivity of solids, modification of new structures and materials, mechanisms of solid-phase transformations (including conditions of high pressures and temperatures, combustion and explosion), development of research methods for fast processes using synchrotron radiation etc.

Locations
The Institute is located in Tsentralny District (Frunze Street 13) and Akademgorodok.

Branches
 Kemerovo Division of Institute of Solid State Chemistry and Mechanochemistry of the Siberian Branch of the RAS

External links
 Институт химии твердого тела и механохимии СО РАН. ГПНТБ СО РАН.
 Механохимия нас связала: ИХТТМ отмечает 75-й день рождения. Наука в Сибири.
 Institute of Solid State Chemistry and Mechanochemistry of the Siberian Branch of the RAS. The SB RAS Portal.

Research institutes in Novosibirsk
Solid-state chemistry
Research institutes established in 1944
1944 establishments in the Soviet Union
Research institutes in the Soviet Union